Carl Friedrich Roewer (12 October 1881, in Neustrelitz – 17 June 1963) was a German arachnologist. He concentrated on harvestmen, where he described almost a third (2,260) of today's known species, but also almost 700 taxa of spiders and numerous Solifugae.

He joined the Nazi Party in the 1930s. From 1933 on, he was the second director of the Übersee-Museum in Bremen, Germany. Under his direction the museum intensified its advocacy of scientific racism.

The Senckenbergische Naturforschende Gesellschaft bought his extensive collection (including type material from other arachnologists such as L. Koch, Eugène Simon, Thorell, Philipp Bertkau and Friedrich Dahl) and his private library. Some of his specimens are also in the Museum für Naturkunde Berlin.

Footnotes

External links

1881 births
1963 deaths
People from Neustrelitz
German arachnologists
People from Mecklenburg-Strelitz
20th-century German zoologists

Nazi Party members